Sir Roger Vaughan of Port Hamal was a 16th-century Welsh landowner and Member of Parliament.

He served on a commission to survey church plate in Brecknockshire and Herefordshire in 1543. He was knighted in 1549 and was appointed High Sheriff of Brecknockshire for 1551–52. He was included in Queen Mary's pardon roll of 1553, and received the stewardship of the castles and lordships of Huntingdon and Kington in 1554.

He was elected Member of Parliament for Breconshire in 1553 (to 1554) and again in 1559 (to 1562). He represented the borough of Brecon from 1562 to 1571 before returning again to represent the county in 1571, during which Parliament he died in office.

He had married Catherine, daughter of Sir George Herbert of Swansea, with whom he had several children. Their eldest son, Watkin, died childless and the estate passed to Catherine, daughter of the second son, Rowland, who married Sir Robert Knollys.

References

Date of birth unknown
Date of death unknown
People from Brecknockshire
Members of the Parliament of England (pre-1707) for constituencies in Wales
High Sheriffs of Brecknockshire
16th-century Welsh politicians
English MPs 1553 (Edward VI)
English MPs 1553 (Mary I)
English MPs 1554
English MPs 1559
English MPs 1563–1567
English MPs 1571